Land's End Airport , situated near St Just in Penwith,  west of Penzance, in Cornwall, is the most south westerly airport of mainland Britain.  The airport is owned by the Isles of Scilly Steamship Company (ISSC). ISSC's subsidiary Land's End Airport Limited operates the airport, and another subsidiary, Isles of Scilly Skybus, operates a regular passenger service to St Mary's in the Isles of Scilly as well as scenic flights around west Penwith.

The airport has a CAA Private Use Aerodrome Licence (Number P568) that allows flights for the public transport of passengers or for flying instruction for daytime use only as authorised by the licensee.

History
Cobham Air Routes started to plan the route linking the Isles of Scilly to the mainland in 1935. Cobham was subsequently acquired by Olley Air Service, whose subsidiary Channel Air Ferries developed the Land's End airport and started a service to the island of St Mary's on 15 September 1937, flying de Havilland Dragons. A hangar was brought from Squires Gate Airport in Blackpool. On St Mary's, until its own airport opened in 1939, the planes landed on the golf course. In 1938, Great Western and Southern Airlines took over Olley Air Service and Channel Air Ferries. It continued the service throughout World War II, during which it replaced the Dragons with de Havilland Dragon Rapides.

On 1 February 1947, the airline and the service were taken over by BEA. On 2 May 1964, BEA replaced the Dragon Rapides with a single Sikorsky S-61 helicopter, operated by BEA Helicopters.  On 1 September 1964, the helicopter service was moved from Land's End to the new Penzance Heliport, although BEA occasionally chartered Britten-Norman Islanders to fly from Land's End when the helicopter was unavailable.

Between 1966 and 1970, Scillonia Airways operated from the airport, flying Rapides. Westward Airways was founded at the airport in 1970, and operated a flying school there from 1971 to 2009.

In 1984, Isles of Scilly Skybus started operations at the airport, initially freight and charter, then scheduled services from April 1987, flying Islanders and de Havilland Canada DHC-6 Twin Otters. Skybus became the sole remaining air link for the Isles of Scilly from October 2012, when the helicopter service from Penzance ended.

On 9 April 2013, a new £1million passenger terminal was officially opened. Work had begun in July 2012 and included new baggage handling and arrivals facilities and a new control tower.

Up to 2014, all of the airport's runways were grass. During the winters of 2012/13 and 2013/14 the airport closed for long periods when the runways became waterlogged, and flights were temporarily moved from Land's End to Newquay. In May 2013, ISSC and the Council of the Isles of Scilly submitted a bid for finance from the European Regional Development Fund for runway resurfacing at Land's End, together with various improvements at St Mary's. In May 2014, the European Commission gave its approval. The cost of the planned asphalting at Land's End was stated to be £2.6M, for which the European fund's contribution was £1.3M. The airport closed on 4 July 2014 for the asphalting of two runways, with Skybus flights diverted to Newquay, and it reopened on 29 July.

Airline and destination

Other operations
Skybus provides scenic flights around south west Cornwall using Britten Norman Islander aircraft. Trinity House also have a depot at the airfield.

Traffic statistics

Passengers and movements

Routes

Transport connections
Skybus operate a shuttle bus from Penzance railway station to the airport. It is possible to book combined rail and air tickets.

References

External links

Airports in Cornwall
St Just in Penwith